Delorme may refer to:

 DeLorme, a vendor of mapping and GPS products
 Delorme, West Virginia, an unincorporated community in the United States
 Delorme operation, a treatment of rectal prolapse

People
 Andre Delorme, (1890-1917), French World War I flying ace
 Danièle Delorme, (1926–2015), French actress and film producer
 Émilie Delorme, born 1975, appointed as first woman director of the Conservatoire de Paris in December 2019
 Marion Delorme, (1613–1650), French courtesan
 Wendy Delorme, born 1979, French actress, writer and performance artist

See also
 Philibert de l'Orme, French Renaissance architect, sometimes spelled "Delorme"